Martin Haldbo Hansen (born 2 February 1969 in Frederikssund) is a Danish rower. Together with Lars Christensen he finished fourth in the double sculls at the 1996 Olympics.

References

External links 
 
 

1969 births
Living people
Danish male rowers
Olympic rowers of Denmark
People from Frederikssund Municipality
Rowers at the 1992 Summer Olympics
Rowers at the 1996 Summer Olympics
World Rowing Championships medalists for Denmark
Sportspeople from the Capital Region of Denmark